Acacia simulans is a shrub of the genus Acacia and the subgenus Phyllodineae that is endemic to south western Australia.

Description
Like most species of Acacia it has phyllodes rather than true leaves. The phyllodes are arranged in whorls with six to nine phyllodes in each group. The rigid, pungent and glabrous phyllodes are patent to slightly reflexed and straight to slightly recurved with a tetragonous or sometimes trigonous cross-section. It blooms from July to September and produces yellow flowers. The simple inflorescences are found singly or in pairs in the axils and have spherical slightly obloid shaped flower-heads containing 16 to 20 cream to pale yellow coloured flower.

Taxonomy
The species was first formally described by the botanist Bruce Maslin in 1976 as a part of the work Studies in the genus Acacia (Mimosaceae) - Miscellaneous new phyllodinous species as published in the journal Nuytsia. It was reclassified as Racosperma simulans by Leslie Pedley on 2003 then transferred back to genus Acacia in 2006.

Distribution
It is native to a small area in the Great Southern and Goldfields-Esperance regions of Western Australia from around Jerramungup in the west to Ravensthorpe in the east where it typically is found growing in sandy soils over quartzite. The range is limited to the Fitzgerald River National Park where it forms part of scrubland or heathland communities that are dominated by Eucalyptus tetraptera.

See also
List of Acacia species

References

simulans
Acacias of Western Australia
Taxa named by Bruce Maslin
Plants described in 1976